Grover is an abandoned townsite in section 29 of Fremont Township in Winona County, Minnesota, United States.

History
Grover had a post office from 1886 until 1902.

References

Former populated places in Minnesota
Former populated places in Winona County, Minnesota